This page lists the World Best Year Performance in the year 2001 in the men's decathlon. The main event during this season were the 2001 World Athletics Championships in Edmonton, Alberta, Canada, where the competition started on August 6, 2001, and ended on Tuesday August 7, 2001. Roman Šebrle broke the world record, collecting 9026 points at the 2001 Hypo-Meeting in Götzis, Austria.

Records

2001 World Year Ranking

See also
2001 Hypo-Meeting

References
decathlon2000
IAAF
apulanta
IAAF Year Ranking

2001
Decathlon Year Ranking, 2001